The 2014–15 Linafoot season (known as the Vodacom Superligue 2014–15 for sponsorship reasons) is the 54th since its establishment. It began on 4 October 2014. A total of 20 clubs participate in the 2014–15 Linafoot.

Team summaries

Promotion and relegation 
Due to the league's expansion from 16 to 20 clubs, no teams were relegated following the 2013–14 season. The four new entries into the league for this season are AS Bantous, AC Capaco, JS Groupe Bazano and RC Kinshasa.

Stadiums and locations

Regular season

Group 1

Group 2

Championship Round

Table

References

Linafoot seasons
Congo
football
football